Splitting Images may refer to:

A Danny Phantom Episode
The 1980s video game